Events in the year 1739 in Norway.

Incumbents
Monarch: Christian VI

Events
Public schools for all children, from the age of seven, is established by law.
Christian Rantzau is deposed as Steward of Norway, and the position was vacant until 1750.

Arts and literature

Nordlands Trompet by Petter Dass is published posthumously.

Births

10 August – Peder Aadnes, rural painter (died 1792).

Full date missing 
 Nicolai Benjamin Aall, landowner and timber merchant (died 1798).

Deaths
1 December – Hartvig Jentoft, merchant (born 1693).

See also

References